Talis dilatalis is a moth in the family Crambidae. It is found in Turkmenistan.

References

Ancylolomiini
Moths described in 1887
Moths of Asia